Bill Barton (born 15 March 1936) is a former  Australian rules footballer who played with North Melbourne in the Victorian Football League (VFL).

Bill went onto play 484 senior games in the Ovens and Murray Football League and the Hume Football League, played in seven premierships and was coach in three premierships too. He was inducted into the Hume FNL - Hall of Fame in 2016.

Brother of Colin Barton, who played with Geelong Football Club and George Barton who played with Hawthorn Football Club.

Notes

External links 

Hume FNL - Hall of Fame

Living people
1936 births
Australian rules footballers from New South Wales
North Melbourne Football Club players
North Albury Football Club players